is a 1993 Japanese comedy-drama film. It is the thirtieth and final film to be completed by Akira Kurosawa. It was screened out of competition at the 1993 Cannes Film Festival. The film was selected as the Japanese entry for the Best Foreign Language Film at the 66th Academy Awards, but was not accepted as a nominee.

Plot
The film is based on the life of Japanese academic and author Hyakken Uchida (1889–1971). While playfully teaching a class as a  professor of German in the period immediately before the Second World War, Uchida tearfully announces his retirement to his crestfallen students.  In 1943, he moves into a spacious house but his wife is concerned about the safety of the neighborhood. Two students arrive to pretend to burglarize the home, but instead find a series of directions written by Uchida on how to break in to the house.  

He hosts a dinner for several of his students, but as a result of wartime shortages he is embarrassed that he and his wife can only serve venison and horse meat.  Their house burns down as a result of U.S. bombing raids, and Uchida and his wife are forced to live in a small shack with no indoor toilet with their few remaining possessions.

After the end of the war, his former students get together to host a banquet to honor him.  As a result of his frequent answer to the question of whether he is ready to die of "not yet", the banquet is the first Not Yet Banquet.  At the end of the raucous celebration, two American military policemen arrive but smile after they see that everyone is enjoying themselves.

With the help of his students, he builds a new house for himself and his wife with a pond that has a small island in the middle.  A stray alley cat arrives and he eventually adopts the cat, aptly naming it Alley.

The lot across from the couple is purchased by a developer who believes their house will be in the way and insists on purchasing it.  Uchida refuses, and realizes that developing the lot will tower over his house.  His students get together, purchase the lot, and return it to the seller who needed the money but also needed the lot.  The seller promises not to disturb Uchida's view.

Alley disappears during a storm.  Uchiro is heartbroken and sinks into a deep depression.  He conducts numerous searches, enlisting his students, local schools, and the townspeople.  Several false leads only lead him to further despair.  On a train, he thinks he sees Alley at a station, but the train pulls away.  He never sees Alley again.

Soon after, another cat appears.  He names it Kurz (German for 'short') and with the new cat, his depression lifts.

His former students hold the seventeenth Not Yet Banquet.  No longer an all-men's affair, children of his students present him with flowers, and the students' grandchildren present him with a large cake.  After receiving the cake and giving his remarks, he collapses from arrhythmia.  He is taken home to rest.  He falls asleep and dreams of playing Hide-and-seek as a child.  The other children keep asking if he's ready while he is looking for a place to hide and he replies, "not yet".  He finally finds a place to hide, and in so doing, looks out toward a golden sun.

Many of the movie's vignettes, like the search for a missing cat and the time Uchida spent in a one-room hut after his home was destroyed in a bombing raid, come from Uchida's own writings, but the movie also gives Kurosawa the chance to comment on aspects of modern Japanese history like the American occupation of Japan that he had only been able to explore indirectly in his earlier works.

Cast 
 Tatsuo Matsumura – Professor Hyakken Uchida
 Kyōko Kagawa – Professor's Wife
 Hisashi Igawa – Takayama
 George Tokoro – Amaki
 Masayuki Yui – Kiriyama
 Akira Terao – Sawamura
 Takeshi Kusaka – Dr. Kobayashi
 Asei Kobayashi – Rev. Kameyama
 Hidetaka Yoshioka – Takayama's son
 Yoshitaka Zushi – Neighbor
 Mitsuru Hirata – Tada
 Nobuto Okamoto – Ōta
 Tetsu Watanabe
 Norio Matsui
 Noriko Honma – Old lady holding a cat

Release
Madadayo was distributed theatrically in Japan by Toho on 17 April 1993. The film was exhibited at various American film festivals beginning on March 20, 1998. It did not initially receive a wide theatrical release and was released directly to television by WinStar Cinema and first broadcast on Turner Classic Movies in September 1999. It was reissued theatrically on September 1, 2000.

English-subtitled DVDs have been released by Winstar and the Criterion Collection in the U.S., Madman in Australia, Yume Pictures in the UK, and Mei Ah in Hong Kong. A Blu-ray edition, without English subtitles, is available in Japan as part of a box set with Rashomon, Ran, and The Quiet Duel.

Reception
In Japan, the film won the awards for Best Art Direction, Best Cinematography, Best Lighting at the Japanese Academy Awards. All these awards were given to their respective crews for their work on both Madadayo and Rainbow Bridge.

Madadayo received generally positive reviews from critics, maintaining an 87% approval rating on Rotten Tomatoes.

See also
 List of submissions to the 66th Academy Awards for Best Foreign Language Film
 List of Japanese submissions for the Academy Award for Best Foreign Language Film

References

Bibliography

External links
 
 
 
 Madadayo  at the Japanese Movie Database

1993 films
1993 comedy-drama films
Japanese comedy-drama films
1990s Japanese-language films
Films about cats
Films about educators
Films about teacher–student relationships
Films set in the 1940s
Films set in 1943
Films set in 1949
Films set in the 1950s
Films set in 1950
Films set in the 1960s
Films set in 1966
Films set in Tokyo
Films directed by Akira Kurosawa
Films with screenplays by Akira Kurosawa
1990s Japanese films